Andreas Udvari (born December 15, 1981) is a retired German decathlete and bobsledder who competed from 2004 to 2007. His best Bobsleigh World Cup finish was third in the four-man event at Igls in January 2007.

References

External links

1981 births
Living people
Place of birth missing (living people)
German male bobsledders